Juan Rodríguez Juárez (1675 in Mexico City – 1728) was an artist in the Viceroyalty of New Spain. He was a member of a Spanish family long noted for their accomplishments in the world of painting. His brother was Nicolás Rodríguez Juárez (1667–1734), who was like himself, an established painter in New Spain. He was the son of Antonio Rodríguez (1636–91), a notable Spanish painter. His maternal grandfather José Juárez (1617–1661) and maternal great great grandfather Luis Juárez (1585–1639) were also notable painters in Spanish history and prominent in the Baroque era. 

As with most artists in New Spain during the late Baroque period, Juan Rodríguez Juárez produced religious art. He also followed the trend of painting portraits of high officials, such as Viceroy Linares and the local nobility. These works followed European models, with symbols of rank and titles either displayed unattached in the outer portions or worked into another element of the paintings such as curtains. Rodríguez Juárez painted "an extraordinary self-portrait, symptomatic of the changing role of the artist in the colony in the eighteenth century." 

A set of early casta paintings (c. 1715) is attributed to him; they are in a private collection at Breamore House, Hampshire, England. Separate canvases show Mexican racial mixtures in a hierarchical order, with Spanish-Indian mixtures coming first, followed by Spanish-African mixtures, then further permutations of racially mixed couples and offspring. They are as follows: Spaniard and India produce a Mestizo; Spaniard and Mestiza produce a Castizo; Castizo and Spanish woman produce Spaniard. Spaniard and Negra produce a Mulato; Spaniard and Mulata produce a Morisca; Spaniard and Morisca produce an Albino. From Mulato and Mestiza produce a Torna atrás. From Negro and India, Lobo ("wolf"); From Indio and Loba produce a crinkly haired (grifo) "Hold-Yourself-In-Midair" (tente en el air); From Lobo and India produce a Torna atrás ("throw back"); From Mestizo and India produce a Coyote; Mexican Indians; Otomí Indians en route to the fair; Barbarian Indians (Indios Bárbaros).

Gallery

See also
Mexican art

Further reading 
Bailey, Gauvin Alexander. Art of Colonial Latin America. London: Phaidon 2005.
Katzew, Ilona. Casta Painting. New Haven: Yale University Press 2004.
Toussaint, Manuel. Colonial Art in Mexico. Translated and edited by Elizabeth Wilder Weisman. Austin: University of Texas Press 1967.

External links
Pintura Colonial Mexicana: Juan Rodríguez Juárez en arts-history.mx
En es.encarta.msn
En Arte Historia

References 

Mexican portrait painters
Religious painters
Spanish Baroque painters
1675 births
1728 deaths
Artists from Mexico City
17th-century Mexican painters
Mexican male painters
18th-century Mexican painters
18th-century male artists